390th may refer to:

390th (King's Own) Light Anti-Aircraft Regiment, Royal Artillery, a Territorial Army (TA) battalion based at Ulverston in the Furness area of north Lancashire
390th Bombardment Squadron or 90th Expeditionary Air Refueling Squadron, provisional United States Air Force unit
390th Electronic Combat Squadron (390 ECS), part of the 366th Fighter Wing at Mountain Home Air Force Base, Idaho
390th Strategic Missile Wing, United States Air Force Strategic Air Command organization, stationed at Davis-Monthan Air Force Base, Arizona

See also
390 (number)
390, the year 390 (CCCXC) of the Julian calendar
390 BC